Galomecalpa tingomaria is a species of moth of the family Tortricidae. It is found in Peru.

The wingspan is 23–25 mm. The ground colour of the forewings is white cream with weak ochreous cream suffusions and strigulation (fine streaks). The dorsum is suffused pale brownish yellow from beyond the base to the tornus. The markings are dark brown. The hindwings are cream, with grey reticulation (a net-like pattern) and terminal suffusion.

Etymology
The species name refers to the type locality, Tingo María.

References

Moths described in 2010
Euliini
Moths of South America
Taxa named by Józef Razowski